Celkon was a mobile phone manufacturing company in India based at Hyderabad. It manufactured dual-sim smartphones, feature phones and tablets. Its smartphones were sold under two brands: CAMPUS and a high-end series MILLENNIA.

Initially its mobiles and tablet PCs were assembled in Taiwan and China. Celkon  started its assembly line in Medchal, Hyderabad with a capacity of 200,000 mobile phones and later set up two more units – one in Tirupati, Andhra Pradesh and other in Hyderabad, Telangana.

References

Indian companies established in 2009
Consumer electronics brands
Electronics companies of India
Indian brands
Manufacturing companies based in Hyderabad, India
Mobile phone companies of India
Mobile phone manufacturers
2009 establishments in Andhra Pradesh